Sather Gate is a prominent landmark separating Sproul Plaza from the bridge over Strawberry Creek, leading to the center of the University of California, Berkeley campus. The gate was donated by Jane K. Sather, a benefactor of the university, in memory of her late husband Peder Sather, a trustee of the College of California, which later became the University of California. It is California Historical Landmark No. 946 and No. 82004649 in the National Register of Historic Places.

History 

Designed by John Galen Howard and built by Giovanni "John" Meneghetti in the Classical Revival Beaux-Arts style, Sather Gate was completed in 1910. Atop the gate are eight panels of bas-relief figures: four nude men representing the disciplines of law, letters, medicine, and mining, and four nude women representing the disciplines of agriculture, architecture, art, and electricity. They were sculpted by Professor Earl Cummings. From 1910 to 1977, the panels were removed due to differences with Jane Sather. By 1979 they were all reinstalled.

Originally, the gate served as the terminus of Telegraph Avenue, and marked the university's south entrance. (The circle in front of the gate served as a turning point for the trolleys coming from Oakland.) The university later expanded further south of Strawberry Creek, and the gate is now well separated from Berkeley's city streets by Sproul Plaza.

Sather Gate has undergone restoration beginning in October 2008 that focused on its bronze and steel metal work, which had deteriorated over time. During its restoration it remained open to pedestrian and vehicular traffic. Restoration of Sather Gate was completed in April 2009. Wiss, Janney, Elstner Associates, Inc., coordinated the restoration of Sather Gate; a 2010 Design Award recipient from the California Preservation Foundation.

Free Speech Movement 

Sather Gate is part of the historic Sproul Plaza, a major center for student activity that housed many protests throughout the Free Speech Movement. The gate is a notable subject of one of the most recognizable and iconic photographs of the movement, a shot of students carrying the Free Speech banner walking through it in Fall of 1964.

References 

University of California, Berkeley buildings
Gates in the United States
Road bridges on the National Register of Historic Places in California
National Register of Historic Places in Berkeley, California
California Historical Landmarks
Bridges completed in 1910
Beaux-Arts architecture in California
Neoclassical architecture in California
John Galen Howard buildings